Bang is an American rock band from Philadelphia, Pennsylvania, active briefly in the early 1970s and again since 2014.

History 
The group was formed by drummer Tony Diorio, bassist/singer Frank Ferrara, and guitarist Frank Gilcken and released three albums on Capitol Records, scoring one minor hit single with "Questions", which reached number 90 on the Billboard Hot 100. They were strongly influenced by Black Sabbath, and are considered forerunners to the doom metal genre. The group briefly reformed in the early 2000s and recorded two more albums worth of music. In 2004, the concept album Death of a Country was released on CD and LP. This album was recorded in 1971 and was intended to be released as the band's first record, but was shelved by Capitol Records because they did not feel that putting out a "heavy concept album" as the band's debut would be commercially viable. Later that year, their self-titled sophomore record was released and became their official debut instead.

On January 6, 2014, Bang announced their reunion. Original drummer and lyricist Tony Diorio continues to contribute lyrics, while Matt Calvarese performed drums live.
In 2016 Bang toured Europe for the first time, including Roadburn Festival .

On August 15, 2017, Bang released their autobiography entitled The BANG Story: From the Basement to the Bright Lights, written with Lawrence Knorr. The book was published by Sunbury Press.

Members 
Frank Ferrara – vocals, bass
Frank Gilcken – guitar, harmony vocals
Tony Diorio – drums, lyrics
Matt Calvarese – drums (2013–2014)
Jake Leger – drums (2014–2016)

Discography

Albums 
Death of a Country (recorded 1971, released 2004 on Rise Above Records)
Bang (Capitol Records, 1972) U.S. #164
Mother/Bow to the King (Capitol, 1972)
Music (Capitol, 1973)
Return to Zero (1999)
The Maze (2004)

Charted singles 
"Questions" (Bang, 1972) U.S. #90

References

External links 
www.bangmusic.com – Official website
AllMusic biography

Hard rock musical groups from Pennsylvania
Heavy metal musical groups from Pennsylvania
Musical groups from Philadelphia
Capitol Records artists
Occult rock musical groups